Graytown is an unincorporated community in southwestern Benton Township, Ottawa County, Ohio, United States.  It has a post office with the ZIP code 43432.

Graytown is a small unincorporated community with few business operations.  Luckey Farmers Inc. and The Country Keg (a restaurant and bar) are two current commercial entities in Graytown.  Other areas of interest include a park with multiple baseball diamonds and soccer fields which are used for various leagues.  Until 2012, Graytown had an elementary school.

References

Unincorporated communities in Ottawa County, Ohio
Unincorporated communities in Ohio